Sigismund III, Prince of Anhalt-Dessau (1456 – Dessau, 27 November 1487), was a German prince of the House of Ascania and ruler of the principality of Anhalt-Dessau.

He was the fourth son of George I, Prince of Anhalt-Dessau, as third-born child of his fourth wife Anna, daughter of Albert VIII, Count of Lindau-Ruppin.

Life
In 1474 Sigismund succeeded his father in the principality of Anhalt-Dessau, but, by virtue of the family law of the House of Ascania, he had to rule jointly with his older brother Ernest I and his younger brothers George II and Rudolph IV.

Sigismund never married or had children; on his death, he was succeeded by his brothers and co-rulers.

Princes of Anhalt-Dessau
House of Ascania
1456 births
1487 deaths